Crenicichla sipaliwini is a species of cichlid native to South America. It is found in the Sipaliwini River, in its upper Corantijn drainage in Suriname.

References

sipaliwini
Fish of Suriname
Fish of the Amazon basin
Taxa named by Alex Ploeg
Fish described in 1987